The Roman Catholic Archdiocese of Sens and Auxerre (Latin: Archidioecesis Senonensis et Antissiodorensis; French: Archidiocèse de Sens et Auxerre) is a Latin Rite Archdiocese of the Roman Catholic Church in France. The Archdiocese comprises the department of Yonne, which is in the region of Bourgogne. Traditionally established in sub-apostolic times, the diocese as metropolis of Quarta Lugdunensis subsequently achieved metropolitical status. For a time, the Archbishop of Sens held the title "Primate of the Gauls and Germania". Until 1622, the Metropolitan Archdiocese numbered seven suffragan (subordinate) dioceses: the dioceses of Chartres, Auxerre, Meaux, Paris, Orléans, Nevers and Troyes, which inspired the acronym CAMPONT. The Diocese of Bethléem at Clamecy was also dependent on the metropolitan see of Sens. On December 8, 2002, as part of a general reorganization of the dioceses of France undertaken, at least in part, to respond to demographic changes, the Archdiocese of Sens-Auxerre ceased to have metropolitan rank and became a suffragan of the Archdiocese of Dijon, which became the centre of a new ecclesiastical province for the Burgundy administrative region. Consequently the Archbishop of Sens-Auxerre no longer has the privilege of wearing the pallium. The current archbishop is Yves François Patenôtre.

History
Until the French Revolution, the Archbishop of Sens was also Viscount of Sens. In 1622, Paris had been elevated to a metropolitan see and the Sees of Chartres, Orléans and Meaux were separated from the ecclesiastical province of Sens. In return, the abbey of Mont Saint-Martin in the Diocese of Cambrai was united to the archdiocese. Sens was suppressed by the Napoleonic Concordat of 1802, which annexed to the Roman Catholic Diocese of Troyes the Dioceses of Sens and Auxerre. The somewhat complex agreement gave the title of Bishop of Auxerre to the bishops of Troyes, and the purely honorary title of Archbishop of Sens to the Archbishop of Paris (otherwise deprived of all jurisdiction over Sens). The Concordat of 1817 reestablished the Archdiocese of Sens and the Diocese of Auxerre, but this arrangement did not last. The law of July 1821, the pontifical brief of 4 September 1821 and the royal ordinance of 19 October 1821 suppressed the Diocese of Auxerre and gave to the Archdiocese of Sens the Department of the Yonne and the Dioceses of Troyes, Nevers and Moulins. A papal brief of 3 June 1823 gave to the Archbishop of Sens the additional title of Bishop of Auxerre. The Archbishop of Sens-Auxerre continued to reside at Sens until the 1920s, but is now resident at Auxerre, while his  cathedra (seat) is at Sens Cathedral.

The history of the religious beginnings of the church at Sens dates from Savinian and Potentian, and through legend to the Dioceses of Chartres, Troyes and Orléans. Gregory of Tours is silent regarding Savinian and Potentian, founders of the See of Sens; the Hieronymian Martyrology, which was revised before 600 at Auxerre (or Autun) ignores them. The cities of Chartres and Troyes have nothing about these men in their local liturgy prior to the 12th century, and that of Orléans nothing prior to the 15th, pertaining to the preaching of Altinus, Eodaldus and Serotinus (companions of Savinian and Potentian). Before the ninth century there was (in the cemetery near the monastery of Pierre le Vif at Sens) a group of tombs, among which are those of the first bishops of Sens. In 847, the transfer of their remains to the church of St-Pierre le Vif inspired popular devotion towards Savinian and Potentian. In 848, Wandelbert of Prüm named them the first patrons of the church of Sens. Ado, in his martyrology published shortly afterwards, speaks of them as envoys of the apostles and as martyrs. The Martyrology of Usuard (around 875) depicts them as envoys of the "Roman pontiff" and martyrs. In the middle of the 10th century the relics of these two saints were hidden in a subterranean vault of the Abbey of St-Pierre le Vif to escape the pillage of the Hungarians, but in 1031 they were placed in a reliquary established by the monk Odoranne. This monk (in a chronicle published about 1045) speaks of Altinus, Eodaldus, and Serotinus as apostolic companions of Savinian and Potentian, but does not view them as legitimate.

In a document which (according to the Abbé Bouvier) dates from the end of the sixth century or the beginning of the seventh—but according to Louis Duchesne, who labels the Gerbertine legend as written in 1046 and 1079 under the inspiration of Gerbert, Abbot of St-Pierre le Vif—is first described a legend tracing to Savinian and Potentian (and their companions) the evangelization of the churches of Orléans, Chartres and Troyes. After some uncertainty, the legend became fixed in the Chronicle of pseudo-Clarius, compiled about 1120. The Christian faith could not have been preached at Sens in the second century, but we know from Sidonius Apollinaris that in 475 the Church of Sens had its 13th bishop; the list of bishops does not indicate that the episcopal see existed prior to the second half of the third century or the beginning of the fourth.

Bishops and archbishops

Before 1000 AD
Among the bishops of Sens in the fourth century were:
St. Severinus, present at the Council of Sardica in 344
St. Ursicinus (356–387), exiled to Phrygia under Constantius through the influence of the Arians. Visited by St. Hilary on his return to Sens after three years of exile, around 386 he founded at Sens the monastery of Sts. Gervasius and Protasius.

Fifth century
St. Ambrose (died c. 460)
St. Agroecius (Agrice), bishop around 475
St. Heraclius (487–515), founder of the monastery of St. John the Evangelist at Sens

Sixth century
St. Paul (515–525)
St. Leo (530–541), who sent St. Aspais to evangelize Melun
Constitutus of Sens attended Fifth Council of Orléans in 549
St. Arthemius, present at the councils of 581 and 585, who admitted to public penance the Spaniard St. Bond and made a holy hermit from a criminal

Seventh century
St. Lupus (Lou, or Leu, born c. 573): bishop between around 609 and 623, son of Blessed Betto of the royal house of Burgundy and St Austregilde (founder of the monastery of Ste-Colombe and perhaps the monastery of Ferrières in the Gâtinais. Some historians believe it to have been founded under Clovis. He received from the king authorization to coin money in his diocese.
St. Annobertus (c. 639)
St. Gondelbertus (c. 642–643), whose episcopate is documented only by traditions of Senones Abbey dating from the 11th century
St. Arnoul (654–657)
St. Emmon (658–675), who around late 668 received the monk Hadrian, sent to England with Archbishop Theodore
(Perhaps) St. Amé (c. 676), exiled to Péronne by Ebroin; his name is suppressed by Duchesne as having been introduced to the episcopal lists in the 10th century
St. Vulfran (692–695), a monk of Fontenelle, who soon left the See of Sens to evangelize Frisia and died at Fontenelle before 704
St. Gerie, bishop c. 696

Eighth century
St. Ebbo, at first Abbot of St-Pierre le Vif; bishop before 711, in 731 he placed himself at the head of his people to compel the Saracens to lift the siege of Sens
His successor, St. Merulf
Hartbert, named in the acts of the Council of Soissons (March 744)
Wilchar, present at the Lateran Council (769)

Ninth century
Magnus, former court chaplain of Charlemagne; bishop before 802 and author of a handbook of legislation he used when traveling as missus dominicus (royal agent for Charlemagne); died after 817
Jeremias, ambassador at Rome of Louis the Pious in the affair of the Iconoclasts; died in 828
St. Alderic (829–836), former Abbot of Ferrières; consecrated Abbot of St. Maur des Fosses at Paris in 832
Vénilon (837–865) anointed Charles the Bald on 6 June 843 at the cathedral of Orléans, to the detriment of the  archbishopric of Reims; his chorepiscopus (auxiliary bishop) was Audradus Modicus, author of theological writings including the poem "De Fonte Vitae" (dedicated to Hincmar) and the Book of Revelations, in which he sought to end the rift between Louis the Pious' sons. In 859 Charles the Bald accused Vénilon at the Council of Savonnières of having betrayed him; the matter resolved itself, but Vénilon was still considered guilty; the name of the traitor Ganelon (in the Chanson de Roland) is a corruption of Vénilon.
Ansegisus (871–883), at the death of Emperor Louis II, negotiated at Rome for Charles the Bald, bringing the letter of Pope John VIII inviting Charles to receive the imperial crown. Ansegisus was named by John VIII primate of the Gauls and Germania and vicar of the Holy See for France and Germany, and at the Council of Ponthion, was installed above the other metropolitans despite the Hincmar's opposition. In 880, he anointed Louis the Younger and Carloman II in the abbey of Ferrières. During the time of archbishop Ansegisus, while the See of Sens exercised primacy, a cleric compiled the Ecclesiastical Annals of Sens, a history of the first two French dynasties.

Tenth century
Walter (Vaulter) (887–923): anointed Eudes in 888, Robert I in July 922, and Rudolph of France on 13 July 923 in the Church of St-Médard at Soissons; he inherited from his uncle Vaultier (Bishop of Orléans) a sacramentary composed between 855 and 873 for the Abbey of St-Amand at Puelle. This document (which he gave to the church of Sens) is an example of Carolingian art and is now in the National Library of Sweden.
St. Anastasius (967–976)
Sevinus (976–999): presided at the Council of St-Basle and incurred the disfavour of Hugh Capet by his opposition to the deposition of Arnoul.

1000–1200

Gelduinus (1032–1049) was deposed for simony by Pope Leo IX at the Council of Reims. The second half of the 11th century saw a decline in prestige for the Diocese of Sens. Under the episcopate of Richerius (1062–96), Pope Urban II withdrew primatial authority from the See of Sens to confer it on the archbishopric of Lyon, and Richerius died without having accepted this decision; his successor Daimbert (1098–1122) was consecrated at Rome in March 1098 after giving assurance that he recognized the primacy of Lyons. Bishop Henri Sanglier (1122–42) caused the condemnation by a council in 1140 of certain propositions of Abelard.

The see regained some prestige when Hugues de Toucy (1142–1168) crowned Constance (wife of King Louis VII) at Orléans in 1152 despite protests by the Archbishop of Reims, and during whose episcopate Pope Alexander III (driven from Rome) installed the pontifical court at Sens for 18 months, on the advice of the bishops.

Guillaume aux Blanches Mains (1168–1176), son of Thibaud II, Count of Champagne, uncle of king Philip Augustus and first cousin of Henry II of France, who in 1172 in the name of Pope Alexander III placed the Kingdom of England under an interdict and in 1176 became Archbishop of Reims
Gui de Noyers (1176–1193)
Michael of Corbeil (1194–1199), who combated the Manichaean sect of Publicans

1200–1500
Peter of Corbeil (1200–1222), who had been professor of theology to Pope Innocent III
Philippe de Marigny
William of Paris, who was also Inquisitor of France
Pierre Roger (1329–1330), later Clement VI
Guillaume de Brosse (1330–1338), who erected at one of the doorways of the cathedral of Sens an equestrian statue of Philip VI of Valois to perpetuate the remembrance of the victory won by the clergy over the pretensions of Pierre de Cugnières
Guillaume de Melun (1344–1375), who with King John II was taken prisoner by the English at the Battle of Poitiers in 1356
Guy de Roye (1385–1390)
Guillaume de Dormans (1390–1405)
Jean de Montaigu (1406–1415), killed at the battle of Agincourt
Henri de Savoisy (1416–1422), who at Troyes in 1420 blessed the marriage of Henry V of England and Catherine of France
Jean Nanton (1422–1432)
Louis de Melun (1432–1474)
Tristan de Salazar (1475–1519), who concluded the first treaty of alliance between France and Switzerland

1500–1800
 Étienne de Poncher 1519–1524
Antoine Duprat 1525–1535 (made cardinal in 1527)
Louis de Bourbon-Vendôme 1535–1557 (cardinal from 1517)
Jean Bertrand 1557–1560 (cardinal in 1559)
Louis de Lorraine 1560–1562 (Cardinal de Guise from 1553)
Nicolas de Pellevé 1562–1592 (cardinal from 1570)
Renaud de Beaune 1595 (lacked papal approval)
Cardinal du Perron 1606–1618
Jean Davy du Perron 1618–1621
Octave de Saint-Lary de Bellegarde 1621–1646
Louis-Henri de Pardaillan de Gondrin 1646–1674
Jean de Montpezat de Carbon 1674–1685
Hardouin Fortin de la Hoguette 1685–1715
Denis-François le Bouthillier de Chavigny 1716–1730
Jean-Joseph Languet de Gergy 1730–1753 (first biographer of Marie Alacoque and member of the French Academy)
Paul d'Albert de Luynes 1753–1788 (Cardinal de Luynes after 1756 and member of the French Academy)
Loménie de Brienne 1788–1793: Minister of Louis XVI, cardinal in 1788; during the French Revolution he swore to the Civil Constitution of the Clergy but refused to consecrate the first constitutional bishops, returned to the pope his cardinal's hat, refused to become constitutional Bishop of Toulouse, was twice imprisoned by the Jacobins of Sens and died in prison of apoplexy.

1800–present
 Anne, Cardinal de la Fare 1821–1829
 Jean-Joseph-Marie-Victoire de Cosnac 1829–1843

 Charles André Toussaint Bruno Raimond de la Lande 1843
 Mellon de Jolly 1843–1867
 Victor-Félix Bernadou 1867–1891
 Pierre-Marie-Etienne-Gustave Ardin 1892–1911
 Jean-Victor-Emile Chesnelong 1912–1931
 Maurice Feltin 1932–1935 (became Archbishop of Bordeaux)
 Frédéric Edouard Camille Lamy 1936–1962
 René-Louis-Marie Stourm 1962–1977
 Eugène-Marie Ernoult 1977–1990
 Gérard Denis Auguste Defois 1990–1995 (became Archbishop of Reims)
 Georges Edmond Robert Gilson 1996–2004
 Yves François Patenôtre 2004–2015
Hervé Jean Robert Giraud 2015–present

Councils of Sens

A large number of Church councils were held at Sens between 600 and 1485. The first involved a controversy over the date of Easter which meant that St. Columbanus refused to attend. The Council of 1140 condemned the writings of Abelard.  The Council of 1198 was concerned with the Manichaean sect of the Poplicani.

Bibliography 
 Plein, Irene : Die frühgotische Skulptur an der Westfassade der Kathedrale von Sens. Rhema-Verlag, Münster 2005, 
Tabbagh, Vincent (ed.) (2010): Fasti Ecclesiae Gallicanae. Répertoire prosopographique des évêques, dignitaires et chanoines des diocèses de France de 1200 à 1500. XI. Diocèse de Sens. Turnhout, Brepols

References

Bibliography

Reference Works
 pp. 548–549. (Use with caution; obsolete)
 p. 284. (in Latin)

Studies

Acknowledgment

External links
Sens at the Catholic Encyclopedia

 
 
Sens